Suren Markosyan (born 17 September 1984) is an Armenian Freestyle wrestler. He became a Junior European Champion in 2004. Markosyan competed at the 2008 Summer Olympics in the men's freestyle 66 kg division.

References

External links
 Sports-Reference.com

1984 births
Living people
People from Garni
Armenian male sport wrestlers
Olympic wrestlers of Armenia
Wrestlers at the 2008 Summer Olympics
21st-century Armenian people